Wrestedt is a former Samtgemeinde ("collective municipality") in the district of Uelzen, in Lower Saxony, Germany. Its seat was in the village Wrestedt. At the 1 November 2011 local government reform, its municipalities merged into the municipality Wrestedt, and the Samtgemeinden Wrestedt and Bodenteich merged to form the new Samtgemeinde Aue.

The Samtgemeinde Wrestedt consisted of the following municipalities:

 Stadensen 
 Wieren 
 Wrestedt

Former Samtgemeinden in Lower Saxony
Uelzen (district)